In geometry, the order-5 square tiling is a regular tiling of the hyperbolic plane. It has Schläfli symbol of {4,5}.

Related polyhedra and tiling 

This tiling is topologically related as a part of sequence of regular polyhedra and tilings with vertex figure (4n).

This hyperbolic tiling is related to a semiregular infinite skew polyhedron with the same vertex figure in Euclidean 3-space.

References
 John H. Conway, Heidi Burgiel, Chaim Goodman-Strass, The Symmetries of Things 2008,  (Chapter 19, The Hyperbolic Archimedean Tessellations)

See also

Square tiling
Uniform tilings in hyperbolic plane
List of regular polytopes
Medial rhombic triacontahedron

External links 

 Hyperbolic and Spherical Tiling Gallery
 KaleidoTile 3: Educational software to create spherical, planar and hyperbolic tilings
 Hyperbolic Planar Tessellations, Don Hatch

Hyperbolic tilings
Isogonal tilings
Isohedral tilings
Order-5 tilings
Regular tilings
Square tilings